Marko Tuomela (born 3 March 1972) is a Finnish former footballer. He is a former international defender who has played for clubs all over the world including Kuusysi Lahti, TPV Tampere, FF Jaro, Tromsø IL, Motherwell (loan), Swindon Town (loan), GIF Sundsvall, Liaoning F.C. and IFK Sundsvall.

Career statistics

International

Scores and results list Finland's goal tally first, score column indicates score after each Finland goal.

References

External links

Finnish footballers
Finland international footballers
FF Jaro players
Tromsø IL players
Motherwell F.C. players
Swindon Town F.C. players
GIF Sundsvall players
Eliteserien players
Allsvenskan players
Finnish expatriate footballers
Expatriate footballers in Norway
Expatriate footballers in Scotland
Expatriate footballers in England
Expatriate footballers in Sweden
Expatriate footballers in China
1972 births
Living people
Association football central defenders
English Football League players